Characteristic admittance is the mathematical inverse of the characteristic impedance.
The general expression for the characteristic admittance of a transmission line is:

where
 is the resistance per unit length,
 is the inductance per unit length,
 is the conductance of the dielectric per unit length,
 is the capacitance per unit length,
 is the imaginary unit, and
 is the angular frequency.

The current and voltage phasors on the line are related by the characteristic admittance as:

where the superscripts  and  represent forward- and backward-traveling waves, respectively.

See also
 Characteristic impedance

References

Electricity
Physical quantities
Distributed element circuits